Instincts of the Herd in Peace and War is the title of an influential book by English surgeon Wilfred Trotter, published in 1916. Based on the ideas of Gustave Le Bon, it was very influential in the development of group dynamics and crowd psychology, and the propaganda of Edward Bernays.

Quotes 
From Instincts of the Herd in Peace and War (1942 ed., pg. 90):

 "It has already been pointed out how dangerous it would be to breed man for reason — that is, against suggestibility. The idea is a fit companion for the device of breeding against “degeneracy”. The degenerate — that is, the mentally unstable – have demonstrated by the mere fact of instability that they possess the quality of sensitiveness to feeling and to experience, for it is this which has prevented them from applying the remedy of rationalization or exclusion when they have met with experience conflicting with the herd suggestion."
 "It is interesting to notice that in discussing the mechanism of psychoanalysis in liberating the ‘abnormal’ patient from his symptoms, Freud repeatedly lays stress on the fact that the efficient factor in the process is not the actual introduction of the suppressed experiences into the conscious field, but the overcoming of the resistances to such an endeavour.   I have attempted to show that these resistances or counter-impulses are of environmental origin, and owe their strength to the specific sensitiveness of the gregarious mind. Resistances of similar type and identical origin are responsible for the formation of the so-called normal type of mind. It is a principal thesis of an earlier essay in this book that this normal type is far from being psychologically healthy, is far from rendering available the full capacity of the mind for foresight and progress, and being in exclusive command of directing power in the world, is a danger to civilization."

Popular culture 
In the James Bond novel : "Live and let die", the villain of the book, Mister Big, speaks about and quotes this book to James Bond, from chapter 21:
"You have doubtless read Trotter’s Instincts of the Herd in War and Peace, Mister Bond. Well, I am by nature and predilection a wolf and I live by a wolf’s laws. Naturally the sheep describe such a person as a “criminal”.
‘The fact, Mister Bond,’ The Big Man continued after a pause, ‘that I survive and indeed enjoy limitless success, although I am alone against countless millions of sheep, is attributable to the modern techniques I described to you on the occasion of our last talk, and to an infinite capacity for taking pains. Not dull, plodding pains, but artistic, subtle pains. And I find, Mister Bond, that it is not difficult to outwit sheep, however many of them there may be, if one is dedicated to the task and if one is by nature an extremely well-equipped wolf."

References

External links
 Archive.org
 Google Books

1916 non-fiction books
Books about propaganda
Books about crowd psychology
Books about social psychology
History of mental health in the United Kingdom